The Greek Font Society is a non-profit organization in Greece, founded in 1992, devoted to improving the standard of Greek digital typography.

It has issued four digital fonts, all with full polytonic support:
 GFS Bodoni, a modernized version of Giambattista Bodoni's 1793 design. (Font details)
 GFS Didot, inspired by Firmin Didot's 1805 design. (Font details)
 GFS Neohellenic, cut by the Lanston Monotype Company. (Font details)
 GFS Porson, originally created by Richard Porson from Cambridge, at the end of the 18th century. (Font details)

Other fonts include:
 GFS Complutum
 GFS Bodoni Classic
 GFS Baskerville
 GFS Gazis
 GFS Didot Classic
 GFS Porson
 GFS Solomos
 GFS Olga
 GFS Neohellenic
 GFS Artemisia
 GFS Theokritos
 GFS Elpis
 GFS Göschen

The society has been quite prolific in the creation of new fonts. It sponsored an international symposium on the Greek alphabet and Greek typography in 1995. For the 2004 Summer Olympics in Athens, it designed and published an edition of the 14 Olympian Odes of Pindar using historic Greek typefaces. The majority of its fonts are licensed under the SIL Open Font License.

TeX versions of the following typefaces are also available: GFS Didot TeX, GFS Bodoni TeX, GFS NeoHellenic TeX, GFS Porson TeX and GFS Artemisia TeX.

A notable recent addition is the GFS Neohellenic Math OpenType font (George Matthiopoulos, Antonis Tsolomitis and others), which may be the only sans-serif math typeface currently (spring 2018) available (freely or otherwise) for use with XeTeX and LuaTeX as well as OpenType-compatible software such as LibreOffice.

References
 Michael S. Macrakis (ed.), Greek letters: from tablets to pixels, proceedings of a conference sponsored by the Greek Font Society, Oak Knoll Press, 1996, . Includes papers on history, typography, and character coding by Hermann Zapf, Matthew Carter, Nicolas Barker, John A. Lane, Kyle McCarter, Jerôme Peignot, Pierre MacKay, Silvio Levy, et al.

External links 
 The Greek Font Society

Arts organizations based in Greece
Typography
Free software Unicode typefaces
Mathematical OpenType typefaces